Tonny Jensen (born 7 September 1971) is an Australian basketball player. He competed in the men's tournament at the 1996 Summer Olympics.

References

External links
 

1971 births
Living people
Australian men's basketball players
Olympic basketball players of Australia
Basketball players at the 1996 Summer Olympics
Sportspeople from Wagga Wagga